BAI Communications, formerly Broadcast Australia, is an Australian telecommunications systems company.

History
Macquarie Bank completed its acquisition of National Transmission Agency in 2002 the seed asset in the publicly listed Macquarie Communications Infrastructure Group (MCIG) fund and rebranded it as Broadcast Australia. The MCIG fund, including Broadcast Australia, was acquired by the Canada Pension Plan Investment Board in 2009.

In November 2019, Broadcast Australia was rebranded BAI Communications.

Operations and acquisitions
BAI Communications has funded a number of initiatives, for example:
 Transit Wireless, a telecommunications specializing in distributed antenna system networks to provide coverage in the places that are unreachable by traditional cellular phone services
 Broadcast Australia are under contract to maintain the digital radio infrastructure for all Brisbane radio stations
 Digital transmission service provider for Television Sydney
 Transmission services for SBS Radio 
 A three-year trial in Sydney extended to six-years of a datacasting service using the DVB-T system for use in Australia, Digital Forty Four
 Transmission services for Southern Cross Austereo

Broadcast facilities
As at February 2022, BAI Communications operated 774 transmission sites across Australia.

References

External links
Company website

Companies based in Sydney
Telecommunications companies established in 2002
Telecommunications companies of Australia
2002 establishments in Australia